Mellenthin is a municipality in the Vorpommern-Greifswald district, in Mecklenburg-Vorpommern, Germany.

Points of interest
 Usedoms Botanischer Garten Mellenthin, a botanical garden

References

External links 

Official website of Mellenthin (German)

Vorpommern-Greifswald